NTPC may refer to:

 Nam Theun 2 Power Company, a Laotian company
 NTPC Limited (formerly National Thermal Power Corporation), an Indian government-owned company
 Northwest Territories Power Corporation, a Canadian company
 New Taipei City, Taiwan
 New Taipei City Government, Taiwan